Comarmondia is a genus of gastropods belonging to the family Clathurellidae.

The species of this genus are found in Europe and Africa.

Species:

Comarmondia aequatorialis 
Comarmondia aethiopica 
Comarmondia gracilis 
Comarmondia inflex 
Comarmondia pamina 
Comarmondia paulula 
Comarmondia salaamensis 
Comarmondia suahelica 
Comarmondia suleica 
Comarmondia sultana 
Comarmondia ulla 
Comarmondia vana

References

Gastropod genera
Clathurellidae